August von Rothmund (August 1, 1830 – October 27, 1906) was a German ophthalmologist from Volkach, Lower Franconia. 

In 1853 he received his doctorate from the University of Munich, and furthered his studies in Berlin under Albrecht von Graefe (1828–1870); in Prague with Carl Ferdinand von Arlt (1812–1887) and in Vienna with Eduard Jäger von Jaxtthal (1818–1884). In 1854 he returned to Munich, where he became director of the surgical policlinic (Reisingerianum). In 1863 he was appointed "full professor", at the University of Munich, where he practiced ophthalmology until his retirement in 1900. He was the son of noted surgeon Franz Christoph von Rothmund (1801–1891).

In 1868 Rothmund was the first physician to describe a rare hereditary oculocutaneous disease that consisted of telangiectasia, erythema, congenital cataracts and bone defects, along with other symptoms. This disorder was to become known as the Rothmund-Thomson Syndrome; named in conjunction with British physician Matthew Sydney Thomson FRSE (1894–1969).

Written works 
 Ueber Radical-Operation beweglicher Leistenbrüche. (Radical operation of inguinal hernia) Kaiser, München 1853. 
 Ueber die Exarticulation des Unterkiefers. (Articulation of the lower jaw) Kaiser, München 1853. (Inaugural-Abhandlung) 
 Beiträge zur künstlichen Pupillenbildung. (Concerning artificial pupil formation) München 1855. 
 Ueber cataracten in Verbindung mit einer eigenthümlichen Hautdegeneration. (Cataracts in connection with persistent skin deterioration)  In: Archiv für Ophtalmologie. 1868, Vol. 14, S. 159–82 
 Ueber den gegenwärtigen Standpunkt der Lehre von den infectiösen Erkrankungen des Auges. (From the present standpoint involving the theory of eye infections) München 1881. (Vortrag) 
 Mitteilungen aus der Universitäts-Augenklinik zu München. (Reports from the University Eye Clinic in Munich) Oldenbourg, München 1882. 
 Casuistischer Beitrag zur Lehre von der Sogenannten Sympathischen Augenentzündung. (Casuisti contribution to the theory of sympathetic eye inflammation) Oldenbourg, München 1882. 
 Einige Bemerkungen über die Anwendung des Sublimats. (Remarks about the usage of corrosive sublimate) M. Rieger, München 1883.

References 
 August von Rothmund @ Who Named It

 Rohto Pharmaceutical - The company was founded by Toyotaro Inoue, a Japanese man who studied under Rothmund, after his mentor.

External links
 

German ophthalmologists
German untitled nobility
1830 births
1906 deaths
People from Kitzingen (district)